Pilomecyna is a genus of longhorn beetles of the subfamily Lamiinae, containing the following species:

 Pilomecyna excavata Breuning, 1940
 Pilomecyna flavolineata Breuning, 1957
 Pilomecyna griseolineata Breuning, 1957
 Pilomecyna grisescens Breuning, 1980
 Pilomecyna longeantennata Breuning, 1942
 Pilomecyna serieguttata (Fairmaire, 1899)

References

Desmiphorini